In the run up to the 2021 Icelandic parliamentary election, various organisations carry out opinion polling to gauge voting intention in Iceland during the term of the Althing. This article lists the results of such polls. The date range for these opinion polls is from the previous election, held on 28 October 2017, to the present day.

The 2021 elections are to be held on 25 September 2021. By law, the election were to be held on or before 23 October 2021. In July 2020, Prime Minister Katrín Jakobsdóttir proposed the date 25 September as the election date. The date of the election was officially published on 12 August.

Polls are listed in reverse chronological order, showing the most recent first and using the dates when the survey fieldwork was done, as opposed to the date of publication. Where the fieldwork dates are unknown, the date of publication is given instead. The highest figure in each polling survey is displayed with its background shaded in the leading party's colour. If a tie ensues, this is applied to the highest figures. When a poll has no information on a certain party, that party is instead marked by a dash (–).

Graphical summary 

D = Independence Party, V = Left-Green Movement, S = Social Democratic Alliance, M = Centre Party, B = Progressive Party, P = Pirate Party, F = People's Party, C = Reform Party, J = Socialist Party.

Polls

Notes

References

Opinion polling in Iceland